Thoughts and prayers is a commonly-used phrase in the United States as a response to a tragedy.

Thoughts and Prayers may refer to:

Thoughts and Prayers (album), 2019 album by Good Riddance
"Thoughts and Prayers" (BoJack Horseman), a 2017 episode of American animated television series BoJack Horseman
Thoughts and Prayers (film), a 2015 stand-up comedy film by Anthony Jeselnik
"Thoughts and Prayers", a song by the Raconteurs from their 2019 album Help Us Stranger
"Thoughts & Prayers", a song by Motionless in White from their 2019 album Disguise
"Thoughts and Prayers", a song by Animals as Leaders from their 2022 album Parrhesia